Hui Lin 慧琳 (737820 CE) was a Chinese translator and Sanskrit scholar.

Born in Kashgar, he was author of the Yíqièjīngyīnyì《一切經音義》, written between 783 and 807 CE, the earliest Chinese lexicographical work to distinguish the labiodentals from the bilabial initials.

References

9th-century Chinese translators
Chinese Indologists
Linguists from China
Sanskrit scholars
737 births
820 deaths
People from Kashgar
Sanskrit–Chinese translators